Alien is a 1982 maze video game for the Atari 2600 published by 20th Century Fox. It is a maze game, based on the 1979 Alien film, and was written by Doug Neubauer who is credited in the packaging as "Dallas North." Neubauer is best known for 1979's Star Raiders. Alien for the Atari 2600 is the first officially licensed game of the Alien film series.

Gameplay 
The player controls a member of the human crew pursued by three aliens in the hallways of a ship. The goal is to destroy the alien eggs laid in the hallways (like the dots in Pac-Man). The player is armed with a flamethrower which can temporarily immobilize the aliens. Additionally, "pulsars" (like the power pills in Pac-Man) occasionally appear which turn the tables, allowing the human to overpower the aliens.

References

External links 
Alien at Atari Mania

1980s horror video games
1982 video games
Alien (franchise) games
Atari 2600 games
Atari 2600-only games
Fox Video Games games
Pac-Man clones
Single-player video games
Video games based on films
Video games developed in the United States